Tresilian may refer to:

 John Tresilian (c. 1450 – after 1515), an English master smith
 Robert Tresilian (died 1388), an English lawyer
 Stuart Tresilian (1891-1974), English artist and illustrator
 Tresilian Bay, Vale of Glamorgan, Wales